Gunn Point Peninsula located just over an hour from Darwin, Northern Territory, is a popular fishing, camping and leisure destination for Territorians and tourists alike. 

Whilst Gunn Point is available for public use it is private property and conditions of use are detailed on https://gunnpoint.com.au/ 

Murrumujuk Beach is a 5.5 km stretch of beach located on the western side of the Gunn Point Peninsula. The beach is a multi-use area shared by people, vehicles, horse riders and wildlife. Visitors are reminded to respect the conditions of use to preserve this unique natural environment so that everyone can continue to enjoy this popular recreation destination.

References

External links

Suburbs of Darwin, Northern Territory